The 2001 European Short Track Speed Skating Championships took place between 19 and 21 January 2000 in The Hague, Netherlands.

Medal summary

Medal table

Men's events

Women's events

Participating nations

See also
Short track speed skating
European Short Track Speed Skating Championships

External links
Detailed results
Results overview

European Short Track Speed Skating Championships
European Short Track Speed Skating Championships
European
European Short Track Speed Skating Championships